The Naples Grape Festival is an annual festival in Naples, New York, United States, dedicated to grapes. The town of Naples is in the center of Finger Lakes American Viticultural Area (AVA), a region known for grape-growing and wine making in the Finger Lakes area of Upstate New York. Around 80,000 people attend the festival each year.

The festival, which has been held since 1961, includes arts and crafts vendors, a wine-tasting tent, food, live music,
 and a grape pie contest. One festival casualty was in 2020, when the COVID-19 pandemic caused it to be cancelled.

Other grape festivals
Grape festivals elsewhere include the Turpan Silk Road Grape Festival in Turpan, Xinjiang Uygur Autonomous Region, China and the Lodi Grape Festival and Harvest Fair in Lodi, California.

See also
Boston wine festival
Food Network South Beach Wine and Food Festival
Tallahassee Wine and Food Festival
San Diego Bay Wine & Food Festival
Temecula Valley Balloon & Wine Festival

References

External links

Festivals in New York (state)
Food and drink festivals in the United States
Tourist attractions in Ontario County, New York
Fruit festivals
Wine festivals in the United States